Rajendra may refer to:

 Rajendra (name), a male given name (including a list of persons with the name)
 Rajendra (moth), a moth genus
 Rajendra Radar, a phased array radar